Blandford is a census-designated place that comprises the populated center of the town of Blandford in Hampden County, Massachusetts, United States. The population of the CDP was 393 at the 2010 census, out of 1,233 in the entire town of Blandford. It is part of the Springfield, Massachusetts Metropolitan Statistical Area.

Geography
The Blandford CDP is in the east-central part of the town of Blandford, at the junction of Massachusetts Route 23 and North Street. Interstate 90, the Massachusetts Turnpike, forms the northeast edge of the CDP, although there is no direct access to the community from the turnpike.

Demographics

References

Populated places in Hampden County, Massachusetts
Census-designated places in Hampden County, Massachusetts
Census-designated places in Massachusetts
Springfield metropolitan area, Massachusetts